Cato is a town in Manitowoc County, Wisconsin, United States. The population was 1,616 at the 2000 census. The unincorporated communities of Cato, Cato Falls, Clarks Mills, Grimms, Madsen, and North Grimms are located within the town. A Manitowoc County park is located in the town which is called "Cato Falls" for a waterfall on the Manitowoc River.

History
A post office called Cato was established in 1870, and remained in operation until it was discontinued in 1998. The town was named after Cato, New York, the former hometown of an early settler.

Geography
According to the United States Census Bureau, the town has a total area of 35.3 square miles (91.6 km2), of which, 35.1 square miles (91.0 km2) of it is land and 0.2 square miles (0.6 km2) of it (0.62%) is water.

Demographics
As of the census of 2000, there were 1,616 people, 548 households, and 458 families residing in the town. The population density was 46.0 people per square mile (17.8/km2). There were 571 housing units at an average density of 16.3 per square mile (6.3/km2). The racial makeup of the town was 97.59% White, 0.50% Native American, 0.68% Asian, 0.62% from other races, and 0.62% from two or more races. Hispanic or Latino of any race were 1.67% of the population.

There were 548 households, out of which 36.1% had children under the age of 18 living with them, 73.4% were married couples living together, 5.7% had a female householder with no husband present, and 16.4% were non-families. 13.7% of all households were made up of individuals, and 5.7% had someone living alone who was 65 years of age or older. The average household size was 2.95 and the average family size was 3.24.

In the town, the population was spread out, with 28.1% under the age of 18, 8.5% from 18 to 24, 30.6% from 25 to 44, 22.6% from 45 to 64, and 10.2% who were 65 years of age or older. The median age was 36 years. For every 100 females, there were 106.1 males. For every 100 females age 18 and over, there were 108.6 males.

The median income for a household in the town was $53,462, and the median income for a family was $59,145. Males had a median income of $36,384 versus $23,750 for females. The per capita income for the town was $21,434. About 3.3% of families and 4.9% of the population were below the poverty line, including 5.7% of those under age 18 and 6.8% of those age 65 or over.

Notable people

 Maurice B. Brennan, Wisconsin State Representative and farmer, lived in the town
 Peter J. Murphy, Wisconsin State Representative and farmer, was born in the town
 Thomas Thornton, Wisconsin State Representative and farmer, lived in and was Treasurer and a member of the town school board
 Thorstein Veblen, a late 19th-century economist, was born in the town

References

External links 
 Town of Cato

Towns in Manitowoc County, Wisconsin
Towns in Wisconsin